The 1970 Copa Ganadores de Copa was the first and only edition of CONMEBOL's club tournament. Teams that failed to qualify for the Copa Libertadores played in this tournament. Eight teams from eight South American football confederations played in this tournament. Colombia and Brazil sent no representatives. Mariscal Santa Cruz defeated El Nacional in the finals.

Qualified teams

Group stage

Group 1

Group 2

Finals

|}

Top scorer

References

 RSSSF Website 

G